Conor Boffeli (born August 29, 1991) is a former American football guard. He played college football at Iowa.

Early years
Boffeli attended Valley High School in West Des Moines, Iowa. He was a Class 4A second-team All-State selection as a senior, three time All-Conference pick.  For his career he had 31 catches for 402 yards and 2 touchdowns as a Tight End. He was also a letterman in basketball and baseball.

College career
Boffeli redshirted his first year in 2009. In 2010 was listed as third-team Center, and saw limited play time in 2011. He started the final 3 games of the 2012 season at Left Guard. In 2013, he started all 13 games at Left Guard, where he received Honorable Mention All-Big Ten and Academic All-Big Ten.

Professional career

2014 NFL Draft

Conor Boffeli went undrafted.

Minnesota Vikings
Boffeli was signed by the Minnesota Vikings as an undrafted free agent on May 10, 2014. He was released by the Vikings on May 19, 2014.

Houston Texans
The Houston Texans signed Boffeli on May 19, 2014. The Texans released Boffeli on August 26, 2014.

Chicago Bears
The Chicago Bears signed Boffeli on October 2, 2014 to the practice squad. On September 5, 2015, he was released by the Bears.

Cleveland Browns
The Cleveland Browns signed Boffeli to a reserve-future contract on January 7, 2016. On August 1, 2016, Boffeli was waived by the Browns.

References

External links
Houston Texans bio
Iowa Hawkeyes bio

1991 births
Living people
Players of American football from Iowa
People from West Des Moines, Iowa
Iowa Hawkeyes football players
Minnesota Vikings players
Houston Texans players
Chicago Bears players
Cleveland Browns players